{{DISPLAYTITLE:C6H4Cl2O}}
The molecular formula C6H4Cl2O could refer to:

 2,3-Dichlorophenol
 2,4-Dichlorophenol
 2,5-Dichlorophenol
 2,6-Dichlorophenol 
 3,4-Dichlorophenol
 3,5-Dichlorophenol